Amanda Houston (born 8 April 1980) is a British weather presenter and DJ, working for ITV Weather.

Career
Houston is originally from Barrow-in-Furness Cumbria; however at 18 she moved to Newcastle upon Tyne, where she became an editorial assistant for the Evening Chronicle and a freelance journalist for Metro Newspaper. She also worked as a DJ and radio presenter.

In August 2008, she became the main weather presenter for ITV Anglia. In October 2013, she moved to London and began covering weather forecasts for various ITV plc regions in England, Wales and the Channel Islands. Since April 2014, she has been presenting national ITV Weather forecasts.

Houston is also a yoga and mindfulness teacher.

Filmography
ITV News Anglia – Lead Regional Weather Presenter (2008–17)
ITV Weather – Regional Weather Presenter (2013–Present)
ITV Weather – National Weather Presenter (2014–Present)

References

External links
Amanda Houston on Twitter

Living people
ITV regional newsreaders and journalists
British television presenters
ITV Weather
People from Cumbria
1980 births